Laura Domínguez Rojo (born 12 August 1997), often known as Laurita, is a Spanish professional footballer who plays as a forward for Liga F club Madrid CFF.

Club career
Domínguez started her career at Madrid CFF.

References

External links
Profile at La Liga

1997 births
Living people
Women's association football forwards
Spanish women's footballers
Footballers from Madrid
Madrid CFF players
Rayo Vallecano Femenino players
Primera División (women) players
Spain women's youth international footballers
21st-century Spanish women